Perestroika is a 2009 American-Russian drama film written and directed by Slava Tsukerman and starring Sam Robards, Ally Sheedy and F. Murray Abraham.

Cast
Sam Robards as Sasha
F. Murray Abraham as Prof. Gross
Oksana Stashenko as Natasha
Ally Sheedy as Helen
Jicky Schnee as Jill
Mariya Andreyeva as Elena
Andrey Sergeev	as Krimsky

Reception
The film has a 57% approval rating on Rotten Tomatoes based on 14 reviews, with an average rating of 5.9/10.

References

External links
 
 

English-language Russian films
American drama films
Russian drama films
2009 drama films
2009 films
2000s English-language films
2000s American films